St. Paul School, Barmer is a CBSE approved school located in Barmer, Rajasthan. It was founded in 2003 by the Roman Catholic Diocesan Education Society based in Ajmer, Rajasthan. The school includes a Catholic church, a football ground, a cricket pitch, a badminton court, a basketball ground and an assembly ground.

External links

Catholic schools in India
Christian schools in Rajasthan
Barmer, Rajasthan
Educational institutions established in 2003
2003 establishments in Rajasthan